Kolky Republic was a temporary state composed of five regions of Volyn, measuring approximately 2500 square kilometers, created after being liberated from Nazi Germany in April 1943 by the Ukrainian Insurgent Army (UPA) and resistance fighters in Volyn. The state was named after its capital, the village of Kolky. The Ukrainians burned Roman Catholic church in Kolky killing about 40 Poles. The Kolky Republic lasted until November 4, 1943, when it was retaken by Nazi Germany using artillery and air attacks.

See also 
 Massacres of Poles in Volhynia and Eastern Galicia

References 

Ukraine in World War II
States and territories established in 1943
States and territories disestablished in 1943
1943 in Ukraine
History of Volhynia
Ukrainian Insurgent Army